Black Saturday (Arabic: السبت الأسود, French: Samedi noir) was the massacre of about 300 Lebanese Muslims and Druze in Beirut by Phalangists on Saturday 6 December 1975, during the early stages of the Lebanese Civil War. It set a precedent for later outbreaks such as the Battle of the Hotels, the Karantina massacre and the Damour massacre.

The killings were led by Joseph Saade, a Phalangist whose son was killed in Fanar earlier that day, when four young Christian Phalangists (Kataeb) were found murdered on the Fanar road in Lebanon. 

The massacre set Beirut ablaze, and accelerated the rapidly escalating civil war.

References

Conflicts in 1975
Battles of the Lebanese Civil War
Massacres of the Lebanese Civil War
Mass murder in 1975
1975 in Lebanon
Christian terrorism in Asia
December 1975 events in Asia
History of Beirut
1975 murders in Lebanon